is a former Japanese football player.

Playing career
Misaki was born in Yaizu on May 6, 1970. After graduating from Meiji University, he joined Japan Football League club Yanmar Diesel (later Cerezo Osaka) in 1993. He played many matches as defensive midfielder and right side back. The club won the champions in 1994 and was promoted to J1 League. However his opportunity to play decreased in 1996 and retired end of 1996 season.

Club statistics

References

External links

1970 births
Living people
Meiji University alumni
Association football people from Shizuoka Prefecture
Japanese footballers
J1 League players
Japan Football League (1992–1998) players
Cerezo Osaka players
Association football midfielders